A wolf trap (Spanish lobera, Italian luparia) was a chase ending in a pit with trapdoor and stakes used by beaters in hunting wolves in medieval Europe.

See also
Wolf hunting
Trapping pit

References

Hunting